Patita may refer to:
 Patita (1953 film), a 1953 Hindi film
 Patita (1980 film), a 1980 Hindi-language Indian film